San Michele de Murato is a church in Murato, Haute-Corse, Corsica. The building was classified as a Historic Monument in 1840.

References

Churches in Corsica
Monuments historiques of Corsica
Buildings and structures in Haute-Corse